TEP may refer to:

Businesses and organizations
TEP, the Society of Trust and Estate Practitioners members' post-nominal
Tallgrass Energy Partners, an American oil and gas pipeline company
Tau Epsilon Phi, a fraternity
Transatlantic Economic Partnership
Tucson Electric Power, the main power company in Tucson, Arizona

Places in the United States
The Equity Project, a charter school in New York
Tucson Electric Park, Arizona

Science and technology

Biology and medicine
Tracheo-oesophageal puncture
Transparent exopolymer particles, a type of polysaccharide
Totally extraperitoneal herniorrhaphy

Chemistry
Tolman electronic parameter, a measure of a characteristic of ligands
Triethyl phosphate

Telecommunications
Transequatorial propagation, a phenomenon associated with TV and FM DX (signal distance searching)
Tunnel endpoint, for an IP tunnel in networking

Other uses
Thomas Edward Perez (born 1961), American politician and lawyer
Test of English Proficiency (South Korea)

See also
Tep (disambiguation)